Hit FM (in Russian: Хит FM) is a private radio station chain in Russia founded on 30 May 1997. It is owned by "Russkaia Mediagrouppa" holding (Русская Медиагруппа).

Initially it started with broadcasts to the Moscow region on 107.4 FM, it now covers around 600 of the big Russian cities, as well as online and satellite (via Eutelsat W7 and Tricolor TV). It also has stations in Moldova, Ukraine, Kazakhstan, Kyrgyzstan.

Hit FM broadcasts mainly contemporary hits (rock, RnB, electronic music).

See also
For comprehensive listings of frequencies: Hit FM (Russian Wikipedia)

External links
Hit FM Russia website
Hit FM Russia online

Radio stations in Russia
Russian-language radio stations
Mass media in Moscow